The non-marine molluscs of Croatia are a part of the molluscan fauna of Croatia (wildlife of Croatia).

A number of species of non-marine molluscs are found in the wild in Croatia.

Freshwater gastropods 

Neritidae
 Theodoxus fluviatilis (Linnaeus, 1758)

Bithyniidae
 Bithynia tentaculata (Linnaeus, 1758)

Hydrobiidae
 Dalmatinella simonae Beran & Rysiewska, 2021
 Horatia klecakiana Bourguignat, 1887 
 Horatia knorri Schütt, 1961
 Horatia ozimeci Grego & Falniowski, 2021
 Horatia stygorumina Grego & Rysiewska, 2021
 Litthabitella chilodia (Westerlund, 1886)
 Montenegrospeum sketi Grego & Glöer, 2018
 Plagigeyeria jalzici Cindrić & Slapnik, 2019
 Radomaniola curta curta (Küster, 1852)
 Saxurinator brandti Schütt, 1968

Moitessieriidae
 Iglica bagliviaeformis Schütt, 1970
 Lanzaia vjetranicae Kuscer, 1930
 Paladilhiopsis insularis Cindrić & Slapnik, 2019
 Paladilhiopsis cf. montenegrinus Schütt, 1959
 Paladilhiopsis stellatus Grego & Hofman, 2021

Valvatidae
 Valvata piscinalis (O. F. Müller, 1774)

Lymnaeidae
 Galba truncatula (O. F. Müller, 1774)
 Radix peregra (O. F. Müller, 1774)
 Stagnicola fuscus (C. Pfeiffer, 1821)

Physidae
 Physella acuta (Draparnaud, 1805)
 Physa fontinalis (Linnaeus, 1758)

Planorbidae
 Ancylus fluviatilis (O. F. Müller, 1774)
 Anisus vorticulus (Troschel, 1834) - in the Krka National Park. First finding of this species in Croatia was in 2009.

Land gastropods 

Aegopinella

 Aegopinella ressmanni (Westerlund, 1883)

Cyclophoridae
 Pholeoteras euthrix Sturany, 1904

Cochlostomatidae
 Cochlostoma auritum meridionale (O. Boettger, 1886)
 Cochlostoma cinerascens beauforti (Clessin, 1887)

Aciculidae
 Platyla similis (Reinhardt, 1880)
 Renea spectabilis (Rossmässler, 1839)

Pomatiidae
 Pomatias elegans (O. F. Müller, 1774)

Ellobiidae
 Zospeum tholussum Weigand, 2013

Azecidae
 Hypnophila pupaeformis (Cantraine, 1836)

Lauriidae
 Lauria cylindracea (Da Costa, 1778)
 Lauria sempronii (Charpentier, 1837)

Pagodulinidae
 Pagodulina pagodula gracilis (Westerlund, 1897)

Agardhiellidae
 Agardhiella formosa (L. Pfeiffer, 1848)

Valloniidae
 Acanthinula aculeata (O. F. Müller, 1774)

Pyramidulidae
 Pyramidula rupestris (Draparnaud, 1801)

Chondrinidae
 Rupestrella rhodia (Roth, 1839)
 Chondrina spelta spelta (Beck, 1837)

Truncatellinidae
 Truncatellina callicratis (Scacchi, 1833)
 Truncatellina velkovrhi Štamol, 1995
 Truncatellina lussinensis Štamol, 1995

Vertiginidae
 Vertigo pusilla O. F. Müller, 1774
 Vertigo pygmaea (Draparnaud, 1801)

Enidae
 Ena subtilis (Rossmässler, 1837)
 Chondrula quinquedentata (Rossmässler, 1837)

Clausiliidae
 Agathylla sulcosa (Schub. & Wagner, 1829)
 Charpentieria stigmatica stigmatica (Rossmässler, 1836)
 Delima binotata saturella (H. Nordsieck, 1969)
 Delima laevissima laevissima (Rossmässler, 1834)
 Medora dalmatina epidaurica (A. Schmidt, 1867)

Ferussaciidae
 Cecilioides acicula (O. F. Müller, 1774)
 Cecilioides sp. aff. janii (De Betta & Martin, 1855)

Spiraxidae
 Poiretia cornea (Brumati, 1838)

Punctidae
 Punctum pygmaeum (Draparnaud, 1801)
 Paralaoma servilis (Shuttleworth, 1852)

Helicodiscidae
 Lucilla singleyana (Pilsbry, 1890)

Pristilomatidae
 Vitrea botterii (L. Pfeiffer, 1853)
 Vitrea contracta (Westerlund, 1871)
 Vitrea crystallina (O. F. Müller, 1774)

Oxychilidae
 Oxychilus hydatinus (Rossmässler, 1838)
 Oxychilus planorbis (Möllendorff, 1899)

Zonitidae
 Paraegopis albanicus (Rossmässler, 1836)

Geomitridae
 Cernuella cisalpina (Rossmässler, 1837)
 Cernuella virgata (Da Costa, 1778)

Hygromiidae
 Xerocampylaea erjaveci (Brusina, 1870)
 Hiltrudia kusmici (Clessin, 1887)
 Monacha cartusiana (O. F. Müller, 1774)
 Monacha parumcincta (L. Pfeiffer, 1847)

Helicidae
 Campylaea pouzolzi (Deshayes, 1830)
 Cornu aspersum (O. F. Müller, 1774)
 Helix secernenda Rossmässler, 1847
 Liburnica setigera setigera (Rossmässler, 1836)
 Liburnica hoffmanni hoffmanni (Rossmässler, 1836)

Bivalvia

Sphaeriidae
 Pisidium casertanum (Poli, 1791)
 Pisidium personatum Malm, 1855

See also
 List of marine molluscs of Croatia

Lists of molluscs of surrounding countries:
 List of non-marine molluscs of Italy (marine border)

References

Molluscs
Croatia
Croatia
Croatia